Retiskenea is a genus of sea snails, marine gastropod mollusks in the superfamily Neomphaloidea.

Species
Species within the genus Retiskenea include:

 Retiskenea diploura Warén & Bouchet, 2001

References

Neomphaloidea
Monotypic gastropod genera